Arthur Norman Michael Halls MBE TD (6 October 1915 – 3 April 1970), also known as Michael Halls, was a British civil servant who served as Principal Private Secretary to the Prime Minister of the United Kingdom, Harold Wilson, 1966–70.

Former Downing Street Press Secretary Joe Haines described Halls in The Spectator: "He was devious but not too clever by half, as some of his intellectual superiors were. Halls, like most men in power, was fascinated by the press. He wanted to know everything that I was doing."

References 
John Ramsden (ed). "Halls, Michael". The Oxford Companion to Twentieth-century British Politics. Oxford University Press. 2002. Page 286.
"Halls, Michael". Les Années Wilson (1964-1970). Centre de recherches et d'études en civilisation britannique. 1998. Page 179.
John Davis. "Harold Wilson and Michael Halls". Prime Ministers and Whitehall 1960-74. Hambledon Continuum. 2007. Page 62 et seq. See also pages 40, 56, 58, 61 to 64, 67 to 73, 75, 77, 78, 99, 197, 200 to 205, 207 and 213.
Andrew Holt and Warren Dockter (eds). Private Secretaries to the Prime Minister. Routledge. 2017. Pages PT321 PT175 and passim.
Kevin Theakston and Philip Connelly. William Armstrong and British Policy Making. (Understanding Governence). Palgrave Macmillan. Pages 153, 154, 158, 159, 174, 180, 182, 189, 190, 193 and 194.
Peter Hennessy. The Prime Minister: The Office and Its Holders Since 1945. Palgrave, for St Martins Press. 2001. Pages 298, 299, 608, 614 and 616.
Kevin Theakston (ed). Bureaucrats and Leadership. Macmillan Press. 2000. Page 83.
Austen Morgen. Harold Wilson. Pluto Press. 1992. Pages 285, 351, 371, 445 and 446.
David Leigh. The Wilson Plot: The Intelligence Services and the Discrediting of a Prime Minister. Random House. 1988. Pages 170, 196 and 197.
Clive Ponting. Breach of Promise: Labour in Power, 1964-1970. Penguin Books. 1990. Page 179.
Nora Beloff. Transit of Britain. Collins. 1973. Page 212.
Dorrill and Ramsay. Smear!: Wilson and the Secret State. Fourth Estate. 1991. Pages 77, 195 and 199.
Peter M Slowe. The Advance Factory in Regional Development. Gower. 1981. Page 18.
Ben Fenton. The secret 'that could have toppled Wilson'. The Daily Telegraph. 14 March 2005.

1915 births
1970 deaths
British civil servants
Principal Private Secretaries to the Prime Minister
Members of the Order of the British Empire